Mountain serin has been split into two species:
 Indonesian serin, Chrysocorythus estherae
 Mindanao serin, Chrysocorythus mindanensis

Birds by common name